Mohamed Yahi (born October 29, 1985 in Tizi Ouzou, Algeria) is an Algerian footballer. He currently plays as a defender for NA Hussein Dey in the Algerian Championnat National.

Club career
 2005-2007 JS Kabylie 
 2007–present NA Hussein Dey

Honours
 Won the Algerian League once with JS Kabylie in 2006

References

Algerian footballers
JS Kabylie players
Kabyle people
1985 births
Living people
NA Hussein Dey players
Footballers from Tizi Ouzou
Association football defenders
21st-century Algerian people